Cindy Diver is a New Zealand writer, theatre director, actor and owner/director of TheatreWorks Ltd, a company that provides casting services as well as acting classes. Diver is most notable for creating and producing verbatim theatre productions on themes such as family violence and dementia.

Biography 
Diver completed a post graduate diploma in theatre studies at the University of Otago in Dunedin, New Zealand. She was a founding member of Kilimogo Productions.  In 1992, with Martin Phelan, she founded her company, TheatreWorks Ltd. Under Diver's management TheatreWorks Ltd continues to provide actor casting services and acting classes. Diver has also helped with the establishment of the Simulated Patient Development Unit at the University of Otago Medical School. The unit employs actors to play patients with whom medical students are trained to interact. Diver also teaches drama to school children and adults.

Verbatim theatre 
In 2009 Diver collaborated with Hilary Halba, Erica Newlands, Simon O'Connor, Danny Still and Stuart Young to create Hush, a verbatim theatre production about family violence. Diver went on to star in the 2012 play Be | Longing, detailing the experiences of New Zealand immigrants. In 2014 Diver co-created another verbatim theatre production The Keys are in the Margarine: A Verbatim Play about Dementia. This latter play toured New Zealand with the assistance of  Brain Research New Zealand.

Random Acts of Art project 
In 2020, during New Zealand's first COVID-19 lockdown period, Diver launched the Random Acts of Art project. This project was formed with the intention of lifting spirits though impromptu theatre events and productions. During the 11 months of the project's existence it supported the creation of 33 events in and around Dunedin.

As at 2021 Diver continues to run TheatreWorks Ltd and is a board member of Wow! Productions, a Dunedin-based theatre collective.

Selected productions 
Hush by Hilary Halba, Cindy Diver, Erica Newlands, Simon O'Connor, Danny Still and Stuart Young.

Be | Longing by Hilary Halba and Stuart Young. Cast: Stuart Young, Hilary Halba, Cindy Diver, Will Spicer, Alex Wilson, Karen Elliot, Julie Edwards, Anya Tate-Manning and Stephen Butterworth.

The Keys are in the Margarine: A Verbatim Play about Dementia by Cindy Diver, Susie Lawless, and Stuart Young.

Family 
Diver's grandfather Charles Diver was the inventor of pineapple lumps.

References

External links 
 TheatreWorks Ltd
 The Keys are in the Margarine: A play about dementia Diver interviewed on Nine To Noon RNZ on 3 October 2019.

Living people
University of Otago alumni
Year of birth missing (living people)
New Zealand theatre directors